Wildcat Township is one of six townships in Tipton County, Indiana, United States. As of the 2010 census, its population was 1,421 and it contained 644 housing units.

History

It was originally part of the Miami Indian reservation until 1847, when the land was available for purchase by white settlers. However, the area had begun to be settled by white squatters as early as 1845. Early farmers traveled to Lafayette to sell farm animals like hogs. Wheat was sold in Peru and settlers traveled as far as Perkinsville to have access to a mill. The earliest religious congregation in the township was founded in the mid 1800s, it was of Baptist denomination.

Geography

Natural environment

Historically, Wildcat Township is very flat. Prior to extensive white settlement, the area had forests with spicebush, dogwood, willow, elm, poplar, beech, sugar tree, ash, and linn. By the early 1900s, the majority of timber had been cut down. The soil is made of "deep, black vegetable mold," that sits on top of "impervious clay sub-soil" and is good for agriculture.

Cities, towns, villages
 Windfall

Adjacent townships
 Union Township, Howard County (north)
 Green Township, Grant County (northeast)
 Duck Creek Township, Madison County (east)
 Madison Township (south)
 Cicero Township (southwest)
 Liberty Township (west)
 Taylor Township, Howard County (northwest)

Governance

Political districts
 Indiana's 5th congressional district
 State House District 32
 State Senate District 20

Education

Early history

The first school in the township was built near Mud Creek in 1848. David Decker was the first teacher. After three years the school was abandoned. A second school was built in Windfall. A former settlement, called Pierce, was the site of the first frame school. Public schools became available in the community after 1855.

Today

Students in Wildcat Township attend Tri-Central Community Schools.

Infrastructure

Transportation

Roads and highways

The first road in the township was surveyed in 1849. It traveled southwest through the township towards Tipton. In 1851, a second road was built in the northern part of the township, traveling east to west. By 1855 the township had an extensive roadway system for the time period.

Airports and landing strips
 the former Zea Mays Airport

Cemeteries
The township contains these three cemeteries: Brookside, Salem and Wheeler.

References

Footnotes

Sources
 Pershing, Marvin W. "History of Tipton County, Indiana: Her People, Industries and Institutions". Indianapolis: B.F. Bowen (1914).

External links
 Indiana Township Association
 United Township Association of Indiana

Townships in Tipton County, Indiana
Kokomo, Indiana metropolitan area
Townships in Indiana